Dwight B. “Deege” Galt IV (born March 12, 1987) is an American football coach and former player. He is currently the Head Strength and conditioning coach for the Virginia Tech Hokies Football program, coaching under first-year head coach Brent Pry. He played college football for Maryland from 2005–2009. Galt was a defensive lineman under Coach Ralph Friedgen.

Early life
Galt earned his bachelor’s degree in Family Science from the University of Maryland, College Park in 2009. Shortly after, Galt earned strength and conditioning credentials from the National Association of Speed and Explosion and from the  Collegiate Strength and Conditioning Coaches Association. Galt is a graduate of Our Lady of Good Counsel High School (MD).

Coaching career
Galt began his coaching career with Maryland as a Football strength and conditioning intern. Galt then moved to work with South Carolina before spending seven seasons with Penn State. Galt has coached in numerous bowl games, including the 2016 TaxSlayer Bowl, 2017 Rose Bowl, 2017 Fiesta Bowl, the 2019 Citrus Bowl, and the 2019 Cotton Bowl Classic. He also coached in the 2016 Big Ten Football Championship Game. 

Galt has been mentored by several head coaches, including Steve Spurrier, Bill O'Brien, James Franklin, and Ricky Rahne. As a coach, Galt has worked with several high-profile players, including Stephon Gilmore, Saquon Barkley, Jadeveon Clowney, Oshane Ximines, and Mike Gesicki.

References 

1987 births
Living people
People from Silver Spring, Maryland
Sportspeople from Montgomery County, Maryland
Players of American football from Maryland
American football defensive linemen
Maryland Terrapins football players
Coaches of American football from Maryland
Maryland Terrapins football coaches
South Carolina Gamecocks football coaches
Penn State Nittany Lions football coaches
Old Dominion Monarchs football coaches
Virginia Tech Hokies football coaches